Calumma roaloko, the two-toned soft-nosed chameleon, is a species of chameleon found in Madagascar.

References

Calumma
Reptiles of Madagascar
Reptiles described in 2018
Taxa named by Mark D. Scherz
Taxa named by Frank Glaw